The 1908 Tie Cup Final was the final match to decide the winner of the Tie Cup, the 9th. edition of the international competition organised by the Argentine and Uruguayan Associations together. The final was contested by Argentine Alumni and Uruguayan Wanderers, which played its first final.

In the match, played at Belgrano Athletic venue on Superí street in Belgrano, Alumni beat Wanderers 4–0, with three goals by Alfredo Brown, achieving its fifth Tie Cup trophy.

Qualified teams

Overview 

Alumni qualified for the final after having won the Copa de Competencia Jockey Club, where the squad defeated San Martín A.C. (3–1), Belgrano (3–0), and Argentino de Quilmes in the final (5–0). The match was held in the Belgrano Athletic venue on Superí and Virrey del Pino streets on 6 September 1908, with an attendance of 7,000.

On 6 minutes, Ernesto Brown drove a corner kick into the penalty area that Bertone turned the ball into Wanderer's own goal. Four minutes later, Alfredo Brown received the ball from a throw-in and after eluding Apesteguy shot to the goal scoring the second goal for Alumni. In the second half, Weiss ran to make a pass to Alfredo Brown who scored his second goal for the 3–0. On 65 minutes, goalkeeper Saporiti hit the ball from a corner kick, but the ball was reached by Alfredo Brown who kicked it with a strong shot that became the fourth goal for Alumni.

Match details

References

t
t
t
t
Football in Buenos Aires